Korie Hlede (born Koraljka Hlede on 29 March 1975) is a Croatian sports administrator. She is a co-founder and leader of basketball development at Flow Basketball Academy (FBA) in Chicago, Illinois. She played and coached professionally before starting her own training program KH Flow. In 2012, she teamed up with Margaret Stender (CEO of the Chicago Sky) to create Flow Basketball Academy.

College years
Hlede was a communications and psychology double major at Duquesne University, where she led the Atlantic 10 conference (A10) in scoring during all of her four years (1994–1998). In 1995, she was named A10 rookie of the year, and by her senior year, she had netted a total of 2,631 points, becoming the only Duquesne player (male or female) to score over 2,000 career points. Hlede holds a number of other school records: steals (334), assists (570), three-pointers made (162), three-point percentage (.356), as well as most points scored in a single game (42 points against University of Dayton on 11 February 1998). Some of her collegiate awards are:  ESPN Academic All-American (1996, 1997, 1998), A10 Player of the year (1996, 1998), A10 first team All-Conference pick (1995–1998),  Kodak District 2 All-American (1995–1998), and Kodak National honorable mention All-American (1995–1998). In 2003, she was inducted into the Duquesne University Sports Hall of Fame and was the first female athlete in university history to have her jersey (#25) retired.

Professional

International
From 2002 to 2008, Hlede competed in the European League, spending time in the First Divisions in Spain, Turkey, Hungary, Croatia, and Brazil. She also competed in three FIBA Cup championships, while reaching the final four of the Euro-league. Hlede led the Spanish and Turkish leagues in scoring during that span.

WNBA
In the 1998 WNBA Draft Korie was acquired by the Detroit Shock (now Tulsa Shock), in the first round (fourth pick overall). In her rookie year, she led her team in three-point field goal percentage and was named WNBA rookie of the year runner-up. In 1999 Korie was traded to the Utah Starzz, where she led the WNBA in three-point field goal percentage in 1999 and 2001. Over her five-year WNBA career, she has accumulated more than 1,000 points, 400 rebounds, 250 assists and 100 steals.

Coaching and training
In 2003 Korie retired from the WNBA and joined the coaching staff of the Detroit Shock (head coach: Bill Laimbeer), where she helped them clinch the Shock's first national championship. After two years of coaching in the WNBA, she spent one year as assistant coach at the University of Rhode Island. In 2010, she created her own basketball development program, KH Flow Training, which was based on her interests in sports psychology and the work of philosopher and psychologist Mihaly Csikszentmihalyi. In 2012, she teamed up with Margaret Stender to create Flow Basketball Academy.

Notes

External links
 Profile
 Profile

1975 births
Living people
American women's basketball coaches
American women's basketball players
Croatian emigrants to the United States
Croatian Women's Basketball League players
Croatian women's basketball players
Detroit Shock coaches
Detroit Shock players
Duquesne Dukes women's basketball players
New York Liberty players
Shooting guards
Basketball players from Zagreb
Utah Starzz players
Women's National Basketball Association players from Croatia
Mediterranean Games gold medalists for Croatia
Mediterranean Games medalists in basketball
Competitors at the 2001 Mediterranean Games